Hopewell is a former unincorporated community in Rio Arriba County, New Mexico, United States. It is located in the Tusas Mountains just above Hopewell Lake, approximately ½ mile south of U.S. Route 64. It was named for rancher and promoter Willard S. Hopewell and had a U.S. Post Office from 1894 to 1906.

There are a number of old prospect pits in the area, as well as a snowpack measuring station that was established in 1993.

Notes

Geography of Rio Arriba County, New Mexico
Ghost towns in New Mexico
History of Rio Arriba County, New Mexico